Salzgittersee (Salzgitter Lake) is a lake in the city of Salzgitter in Lower Saxony, Germany. At an elevation of 78 m, its surface area is 0.75 km².

Lakes of Lower Saxony